Wang Luolin (born June 1938) is a Chinese economist, educator and politician who served as party secretary of Xiamen University between 1989 and 1994.

He was an alternate member of the 13th Central Committee of the Chinese Communist Party, 14th Central Committee of the Chinese Communist Party and 16th Central Committee of the Chinese Communist Party, and a member of the 15th Central Committee of the Chinese Communist Party. He was a delegate to the 9th and 10th National People's Congress.

Biography
In 1960, he graduated from the Department of Economics, Peking University. Starting in 1961, he successively served as lecturer, associate professor, and full professor of Xiamen University. He was appointed vice president in 1984, concurrently serving as party secretary since 1989. In 1993, he was appointed vice president of the Chinese Academy of Social Sciences.

Publications

References

1938 births
Living people
People from Wuhan
Chinese economists
Educators from Hubei
Peking University alumni
Academic staff of Xiamen University
People's Republic of China politicians from Hubei
Chinese Communist Party politicians from Hubei
Alternate members of the 13th Central Committee of the Chinese Communist Party
Alternate members of the 14th Central Committee of the Chinese Communist Party
Alternate members of the 16th Central Committee of the Chinese Communist Party
Members of the 15th Central Committee of the Chinese Communist Party
Delegates to the 9th National People's Congress
Delegates to the 10th National People's Congress